Amma Kanakku is a 2016 Indian Tamil language comedy drama film written and directed by Ashwiny Iyer Tiwari and produced by both Anand L. Rai and Dhanush. A remake of the director's own Hindi film Nil Battey Sannata (2016), the film stars Amala Paul, Yuva Lakshmi, Revathi and Samuthirakani in the lead roles. Principal photography of the film commenced on 7 January 2016 in Chennai.

Plot
A young, widowed, high school dropout mother, Shanti (Amala Paul) is employed as a servant in Dr. Nandhini's (Revathi) house where she is treated as part of the family. Shanti works in several other place to supplement her monthly income so that she can provide a better life for her daughter Abhinaya (Yuva Lakshmi). However, Abhinaya is not interested in her studies and loves to chat with her friends, watch TV, and play.

One day, Abhinaya conveys to her mother that her ambition in life is to become a servant as well. Shanti is dismayed hearing this and conveys this to her boss, who in turn advises her to challenge her daughter. Shanti realizes that if she were more educated, she would be able to mentor as well as tutor her daughter and thus motivate her to improve in her studies. So with Nandhini's help, she is enrolled in the same school as her daughter. This infuriates Abhinaya, who hates to see her mother in her daily school life. Shanti proves to her daughter that age is not a major deterrent to learning and that she can pick up where she left off several years ago. Shanti studies hard and challenges Abhinaya to score higher marks than her in the half-yearly exams. Abhinaya starts taking math seriously and does well in her exams. Seeing this, Shanti thinks Abhinaya has turned over into a new leaf and her attitude has changed, so she wants to discontinue school. Seeing this, Abhinaya confesses that her hard work to succeed in math and pass the exam was so that her mother could drop out of school.

There is this wonderful twist which shows the psychology of human nature. Shanti works night and day to earn and collect money for her daughter's future, while the daughter spends all that earned money in one day. Abhinaya comes home with new clothes and shoes to find her mother looking through jars to find where the money she earned for Abhinaya's future went. They argue, and Abhinaya says that she knows what Shanti's job is and that she sees a man drop her home every day at night. Abhinaya finally learns the truth about her mother from her classmate and is ashamed of her rebellious behavior. She realizes the value of education and her mother's dream, which is Abhinaya. Her goal is to make Abhinaya's life more independent. The final scenes show Abhinaya passing her 10thsStandard, and then years later getting interviewed by IAS Officers, who ask her why she is pursuing Civil Services, and her reply says it all: "So that I do not become a maid".

Cast

Production
In November 2015, Ashwini Iyer Tiwari agreed terms to direct a remake of her Hindi film, Nil Battey Sannata in Tamil, for producers Dhanush and Anand L. Rai. Dhanush had been shown a preview of the film by Rai, during a visit to Mumbai in September 2015 and the duo chose to co-produce the film, with Ashwini Iyer retained as director. Amala Paul and Revathi were signed on to play the leading roles, while Samuthirakani also accepted to portray another pivotal role in the film. The film began shooting on 7 January 2016 with a launch ceremony held in Chennai and completed on 23 February 2016.

Soundtrack

Music composed by Ilaiyaraaja.

Home media
The satellite rights of the film were sold to [STAR Vijay]

References

External links 
 

2010s Tamil-language films
2016 films
Tamil remakes of Hindi films
Films scored by Ilaiyaraaja
Films about the education system in India
Films directed by Ashwiny Iyer Tiwari